Sutton Coldfield Town Football Club is an English association football club based in Sutton Coldfield.

Despite being the largest team in a town with a population of over 105,000 people (more than that of the home towns of many full-time professional teams), their profile suffers due to their geographical proximity to Aston Villa, who draw considerable support from the town.

History
The club was founded in 1879 and played its first match against the 2nd XI of Birmingham F.C. (no connection to the modern Birmingham City) on 1 February of that year.  In their early years, they played in Sutton Park and competed in the Central Birmingham League, Aston and District League, Small Heath League, and Suburban League.  In the 1930s, now playing at Coles Lane, they competed in the Birmingham Alliance and Birmingham Combination but met with little success.

After World War II, the club, at the time playing under the name Sutton Town (a name which lasted until 1964), played in the Walsall League and Birmingham Combination before joining the Birmingham & District League (soon to be renamed the West Midlands (Regional) League) in 1954.  During the next decade, they struggled in the league with financial problems caused by a devastating fire at their ground forcing them to field only amateur players before switching leagues to the Worcestershire Combination (soon to be renamed the Midland Football Combination) in 1964.  They were champions of this league on two occasions before rejoining the West Midlands (Regional) League in 1979, where they were champions at the first attempt.  In 1982, after a second-place finish, they stepped up to the Southern League.  At the first attempt, they were promoted to the Premier Division but were relegated straight back to the second tier where they remained until the end of the 2009–10 season, before being transferred to the Northern Premier League Division One South.

On , Sutton Coldfield took part in their first ever Birmingham Senior Cup final, which they won with a 1–0 win over Nuneaton Town. During the summer of 2011, the club installed a new third generation (3G) football pitch. After 12 years at the helm, Chris Keogh resigned as manager in September 2012.  His assistant, Neil Tooth, was promoted to the manager's role.  In 2015, Sutton won promotion via the play-offs to the Premier Division.  In the 2017-18 season, Sutton were relegated with three games remaining after a 2–1 away defeat to Barwell.

Management and coaching staff

Current staff

Managerial history

See Sutton Coldfield Town F.C. Managers

Honours
Birmingham Senior Cup
Champions: 2010–2011
Runners-up: 2012–2013

Records
Best league performance: 17th in Southern League Premier Division, 1983–1984
Best FA Cup performance: First Round Proper, 1980–1981, 1992–1993
Best FA Trophy performance: Third Round Proper, 2004–2005

See also
Sutton Coldfield Town F.C. players
Sutton Coldfield Town F.C. managers

Sources

References

External links
 
 Game photographs archive

1879 establishments in England
Association football clubs established in 1879
Football clubs in England
Football clubs in the West Midlands (county)
Southern Football League clubs
Sport in Birmingham, West Midlands
 
Sutton Coldfield